Spy Snatcher is a floppy disk-based text adventure released by Topologika Software in 1988. It was the last professional text adventure to be released on the BBC Micro and Acorn Electron. It was also released for ZX Spectrum (+3 disk only), RISC OS, PC, Amstrad CPC, Amstrad PCW, Atari ST and Nimbus.

Plot
The secret plans for the Sonic Macrothrodule have been leaked to foreign powers by a mole.
You play an agent of MI7 and have only an hour to solve the puzzle and reveal the mole.

External links

1988 video games
1990s interactive fiction
Acorn Archimedes games
Amstrad CPC games
Amstrad PCW games
Atari ST games
BBC Micro and Acorn Electron games
DOS games
Single-player video games
Spy video games
Video games developed in the United Kingdom
ZX Spectrum games